An inselberg or monadnock is an isolated rock hill, knob, ridge, or small mountain that rises abruptly from a gently sloping or virtually level surrounding plain.
In Southern Africa a similar formation of granite is known as a koppie, an Afrikaans word ("little head") from the Dutch diminutive word kopje.  If the inselberg is dome-shaped and formed from granite or gneiss, it can also be called a bornhardt, though not all bornhardts are inselbergs. 
An inselberg results when a body of rock resistant to erosion, such as granite, occurring within a body of softer rocks, is exposed by differential erosion and lowering of the surrounding landscape.

Etymology

Inselberg 
The word inselberg is a loan word from German, and means "island mountain". The term was coined in 1900 by geologist Wilhelm Bornhardt (1864–1946) to describe the abundance of such features found in eastern Africa. At that time, the term applied only to arid landscape features. However, it has since been used to describe a broader geography and range of rock features, leading to confusion about the precise definition of the term. 

In a 1973 study examining the use of the term, one researcher found that the term had been used for features in savannah climates 40% of the time, arid or semi-arid climates 32% of the time, humid-subtropical and arctic 12% of the time, and 6% each in humid-tropical and Mediterranean climates. A 1972 paper defined inselbergs as "steep-sided isolated hills rising relatively abruptly above gently sloping ground". This definition includes such features as buttes; conical hills with rectilinear sides typically found in arid regions; regolith-covered concave-convex hills; rock crests over regolith slopes; rock domes with near vertical sides; tors (koppies) formed of large boulders but with solid rock cores. Thus, the terms monadnock and inselberg may not perfectly match, though some authors have explicitly argued these terms are completely synonymous.

Monadnock 
Monadnock is derived from a Native American term for an isolated hill or a lone mountain that stands above the surrounding area, typically by surviving erosion. Geologists took the name from Mount Monadnock in southwestern New Hampshire. It is thought to derive from the Abenaki language, from either menonadenak ("smooth mountain") or menadena ("isolated mountain"). In this context, monadnock is used to describe a mountain that rises from an area of relatively flat and/or lower terrain.

Geology

Geological and geographical patterns 

Inselbergs are common in eroded and weathered shields. The presence of an inselberg typically indicates the existence of a nearby plateau or highland, or their remnants. This is especially the case for inselbergs composed of sedimentary rock, which will display the same stratigraphic units as this nearby plateau. However once exposed, the inselbergs are destroyed by marginal collapse of joint blocks and exfoliation sheets. This process leaves behind tors perched at their summits and, over time, a talus-bordered residual known as a castle koppie appears. By this association various inselberg fields in Africa and South America are assumed to be the vestiges of eroded etchplains.

Clusters of inselbergs, called inselberg fields and inselberg plains, occur in various parts of the world, including Tanzania, the Anti-Atlas of Morocco, Northeast Brazil, Namibia, the interior of Angola, and the northern portions of Finland and Sweden.

The classification of Anthony Young (1969) distinguishes six types of inselbergs; buttes, conical hills, convex-concave hills, rock crest over regolith-covered slope, rock dome (sugarloaf) and kopje or tor. 

The types of rock of which inselbergs are made of include granite, gneiss and gabbro.

Origin and development

Summarizing the understanding on the origin of inselbergs in 1974, geomorphologist Michael Thomas writes "Hypotheses for the development of inselbergs have been advanced, refuted and reiterated over a period of more than seventy years." Volcanic or other processes may give rise to a body of rock resistant to erosion, inside a body of softer rock such as limestone, which is more susceptible to erosion. When the less resistant rock is eroded away to form a plain, the more resistant rock is left behind as an isolated mountain. The strength of the uneroded rock is often attributed to the tightness of its jointing. 

Inselbergs can be reshaped by ice sheets much the same way as roches moutonnées. In northern Sweden, examples of this type of inselberg are called flyggbergs.

Ecology 
The inselbergs of Eastern Africa tend to be a refuge for life in the Serengeti of Tanzania and in the Masai Mara of Kenya. Where the soil is too thin or hard to support tree life in large areas, soil trapped by inselbergs can be dense with trees while the surrounding land contains only short grass. Hollows in the rock surfaces provide catchments for rainwater. Many animals have adapted to the use of inselbergs, including the lion, the hyrax, and an abundance of bird and reptile life.

Gallery

See also

Notes

References

External links